Needle Bed is the first studio album recorded by John Ralston. The album was released on June 6, 2006 on Vagrant Records. It was initially released privately and later re-released under the Vagrant label. A music video was shot for  the promotional single, "Gone Gone Gone". Ralston toured with Dashboard Confessional in support of this record.

Track listing
 "No Catcher in the Rye" (1:21)
 "It's Not Your Fault" (2:49)
 "Hang a Sign" (3:16)
 "When We Are Cats" (2:23)
 "I Believe In Ghosts" (2:33)
 "No One Said It Was Easy" (3:03)
 "Gone Gone Gone" (3:51)
 "Time for Me to Ruin Everything" (3:17)
 "Keep Me" (2:07)
 "Avalanche" (3:14)
 "Our Favorite Record Skips" (3:31)

References

John Ralston (musician) albums
2006 albums